Ulrich Thychosen (born July 19, 1956) is a former Danish footballer

Biography 
Ulrich Thychosen spend his childhood years in Vejle FC, before he moved to Vejle Boldklub. He made his debut for the first team in 1975 against Leicester City.

Ulrich Thychosen was a spectacular dribbler with a fantastic technique. Unfortunately a big part of his footballing career was ruined by injuries. But despite this he won the Danish Cup with Vejle Boldklub three times in 1975, 1977 and 1981.

Ulrich Thychosen's brother Steen Thychosen also played for Vejle Boldklub and the Danish national team.

External links 
Vejle Boldklub > Statistics
The Crazy Reds > Club History

1956 births
Living people
Danish men's footballers
Denmark international footballers
Vejle Boldklub players
Association football midfielders